Kosh-Agach (Koş-Agaş; , Qosağaş) is a rural locality (a selo) and the administrative center of Kosh-Agachsky District of the Altai Republic, Russia. Population:

Geography

Climate
According to the Köppen Climate Classification, Kosh-Agach has a cold semi-arid climate (BSk).

Geology
The Baratal limestone, potentially the oldest atoll in the world, was found here.

References

Notes

Sources

Rural localities in Kosh-Agachsky District